Sami Bayraktar (also known as Sammy Bayraktar in Belgium; born 1978) is a Turkish-Belgian futsal player.  Sami Bayraktar currently plays for Alliance Ecaussines and played for Barca Ottignies between the 2003 and 2007 seasons.

He is a member of the Turkey national futsal team in the UEFA Futsal Championship.

References

External links 
 Profile at futsalteam.com

1978 births
Living people
Turkish men's futsal players
Belgian people of Turkish descent